Pluralibacter gergoviae (formerly Enterobacter gergoviae) is a Gram-negative, motile, facultatively-anaerobic, rod-shaped bacterium. P. gergoviae is of special interest to the cosmetics industry, as it displays resistance to parabens, a common antimicrobial agent added to cosmetic products.

Background
Enterobacter gergoviae was first proposed as a novel species in 1980. The species name is derived from the Gergovie plateau, which is located near Clermont-Ferrand University Hospital; the type strain was isolated at this hospital during a nosocomial outbreak of P. gergoviae. In 2013, the species was reclassified into the novel genus, Pluralibacter, and is the type species for the genus.

Pluralibacter gergoviae has been isolated from maize, grapes, coffee beans, spring water, fruit flies, and pink bollworms. It is an uncommon human pathogen, most commonly as an opportunistic nosocomial infection. One hospital in Spain reported the organism to represent 0.4% of clinical Enterobacter isolates. Risk factors include prolonged hospital stays, "immunosuppression, the presence of a foreign device, prior use of anti-microbial agents in the patient involved, and extremes of age." In the cosmetic industry, P. gergoviae has been implicated in recalls of eye cream, children's shampoo, skin cream, hand cleaning paste, and cleansing wipes.

Pluralibacter gergoviae is resistant to penicillins (specifically benzylpenicillin, oxacillin),  macrolides (with the exception of azithromycin), lincosamides (specifically lincomycin and clindamycin), streptogramins, rifampicin, fusidic acid, and fosfomycin. P. gergoviae is also resistant to cefoxitin, likely due to β-lactamase production.

References

Enterobacteriaceae
Gram-negative bacteria